The Nation's Call for Humanity and Right is a World War I song written by N.A.W. Carty. It was published in 1918 by N.A.W. Carty in Lawrence, MA. The sheet music cover depicts a sailor and a soldier flanking a civilian holding a flag.
	

The piece was written for two voices (1st & 2nd soprano) and piano.

The sheet music can be found at the Pritzker Military Museum & Library.

References

External links 
 Sheet music and song MP3 from the Illinois Digital Archive.

1918 songs
Songs of World War I